Natardan (also Romanized as Nātardān) is a village in Gohreh Rural District, Fin District, Bandar Abbas County, Hormozgan Province, Iran. At the 2006 census, its population was 25, in 6 families.

References 

Populated places in Bandar Abbas County